Liam Bevan Malone  (born 23 December 1993) is a former New Zealand para-athlete, primarily competing in sprint events. He represented New Zealand at the 2016 Summer Paralympics in Rio de Janeiro, where he won gold medals in the men's 200 metres T44 and 400 metres T44, and the silver medal in the men's 100 metres T44.

Personal life
Malone was born in Nelson, the son of Murray Robert Malone and Trudi Scott. He grew up in the suburb of Stoke and was educated at Nayland College. He is the grandson of Peter Malone, who served as the mayor of Nelson from 1980 to 1992. He is also the great-great-great-grandson of Robert Trimble, a 19th-century member of the New Zealand Parliament, and the great-great-great-great-grandson of Abel Heywood, who served two separate terms as mayor of Manchester in the 1860s and 1870s. Malone is also the great-great-great-nephew of Lieutenant Colonel William George Malone, who commanded the Wellington Infantry Battalion at Gallipoli.

Malone was born with fibular hemimelia (congenital absence of the fibula bone) in both legs. As a result, his legs were amputated just above his ankles when he was 18 months old.

Career
As a double below-knee amputee, Malone is classified T43 for running events.

Malone was officially selected to represent New Zealand at the 2016 Summer Paralympics on 23 May 2016. At the Paralympics, he won the silver medal in the men's 100 metres T44, and the gold medals in the men's 200 metres T44 and men's 400 metres T44. His two gold medals were achieved in Paralympic record time, taking the records from disgraced South African sprinter Oscar Pistorius.

Malone was selected as New Zealand's flag bearer for the 2016 Summer Paralympics closing ceremony. He was appointed a Member of the New Zealand Order of Merit in the 2017 New Year Honours, for his services to athletics.

Malone announced his retirement from athletics in January 2018.

Malone began working in Artificial Intelligence start up Soul Machines immediately after retirement, the company is led by Oscar Award winner Dr Mark Sagar.

Malone is also a popular keynote speaker and is represented by Celebrity Speakers New Zealand.

Personal bests

References

External links
  (archive)
 
 Meet Our Paralympians: Liam Malone – Attitude Live video profile

1993 births
Living people
Sportspeople from Nelson, New Zealand
New Zealand male sprinters
Paralympic athletes of New Zealand
Athletes (track and field) at the 2016 Summer Paralympics
Medalists at the 2016 Summer Paralympics
Paralympic gold medalists for New Zealand
Paralympic silver medalists for New Zealand
People educated at Nayland College
Members of the New Zealand Order of Merit
Paralympic medalists in athletics (track and field)